Bahmai-ye Garmsiri-ye Shomali Rural District is a rural district (dehestan) in Bahmai-ye Garmsiri District, Bahmai County, Kohgiluyeh and Boyer-Ahmad Province, Iran. At the 2006 census, its population was 7,729, in 1,477 families. The rural district has 70 villages.

References 

Rural Districts of Kohgiluyeh and Boyer-Ahmad Province
Bahmai County